Aldehyde oxidase 1 is an enzyme that in humans is encoded by the AOX1  gene.

Aldehyde oxidase produces hydrogen peroxide and, under certain conditions, can catalyze the formation of superoxide.

Clinical significance 

Aldehyde oxidase is a candidate gene for amyotrophic lateral sclerosis.

See also
 MOCOS

References

External links

Further reading

EC 1.2.3